Nina Needs to Go! is an animated series of shorts that aired on Disney Junior, beginning in February 2014. Each short is approximately three minutes long. The series is targeted at preschoolers. It is produced by Bristol-based animation studio ArthurCox.

Overview
The titular 4-year-old Nina goes to a variety of settings, like the zoo and the beach. In each location, Nina finds she "needs to go" to the bathroom after becoming too engrossed in play, and the mission is to get her there before it is too late.

The scenario is familiar to parents of toddlers the world over and inspired by real life. Sarah Cox, Creative Director and CEO of ArthurCox has explained: "Nina Needs To Go is based on my real experiences with my daughter. Dramatic car journeys, missed trains and a back track through the whole of the Alhambra in Spain in search of a bathroom are real situations that have inspired each episode. A fabulous creative team has helped us create action-packed 'race against time' scenarios to excite and amuse a family audience."

Characters 
 Nina: a 4-year-old girl and title character of the series, voiced by Aubree Young
 Nana: Sheila, Nina's grandmother. Sometimes, she would show up to help Nina reach the bathroom in time. Voiced by Miriam Margolyes 
 Kate: Nina's mother, voiced by Colleen O'Shaughnessey
 Nat: Nina's father, voiced by Jess Harnell
 Frank: Nina's older brother, voiced by Josie Totah 
 Amber: Nina's best friend

Episodes

 "Train" – Nina has to use the bathroom on a train. Trouble ensues when the train is crowded.
 "Snow" – Nina insists that she does not have to use the bathroom until she and her mother are on a ski lift.
 "Mall" – Nina has to use the bathroom while buying a dress at the mall.
 "Play" – Nina has to use the bathroom while dressed as a rock at a play.
 "Water Park" – Frank tries to help Nina find a bathroom at a water park.
 "Beach" – Nina has to use the bathroom while building sand castles at the beach.
 "DIY" – Nina has to use the bathroom while at the hardware store with her father.
 "Zoo" – Nina has to use the bathroom while at a zoo.
 "Camping" – Nina does not want to use the bathroom in the woods, however, there are no bathrooms in the woods.
 "Tower" – Nina has to go to the bathroom on a trip to the Tower of London.
 "County Fair" – Frank tries to help Nina find a bathroom during a three-legged race.
 "Parade" – Nina has to use the bathroom while being dressed as a mermaid in a parade.
 "Wedding" – Nina has to use the bathroom during Aunt Gladys' wedding.
 "Traffic" – Nina has to use the bathroom while her family gets stuck in traffic en route to Aunt Gladys' trailer.
 "Library" – Nina has to use the bathroom while hearing a story about a knight during story time.
 "To Sleep" – Nina has trouble going to sleep.
 "On a Playdate" – Nina has a playdate with her best friend, Amber.
 "To the Museum" – Nina gets lost in a museum.
 "To a Fancy Restaurant" – Nina's meatball escapes her plate.
 "To Preschool" – Nina is worried about going to preschool.

References

External links
 
 

2010s American animated television series
American flash animated television series
American children's animated adventure television series
American children's animated fantasy television series
American preschool education television series
Animated preschool education television series
2010s preschool education television series
Animated television series about children
Animated television series about families
Animated television series about siblings
Disney Junior original programming
Television series by Disney
English-language television shows